Șaru Dornei is a commune located in Suceava County, Western Moldavia, Romania. It is composed of seven villages: Gura Haitii, Neagra Șarului (the commune centre), Plaiu Șarului, Sărișor, Sărișoru Mare, Șaru Bucovinei and Șaru Dornei.

References

Communes in Suceava County
Localities in Western Moldavia